"Brown Eyes" is a song by Fleetwood Mac from the 1979 double LP Tusk. It was one of six songs from the album composed and sung by Christine McVie.

Background
Original guitarist Peter Green also took part in the sessions for "Brown Eyes", but his playing on the track is not credited on the original album release. Mick Fleetwood, the band's drummer, remembers that Green still remained in contact with the band and occasionally joined them in the studio. At Fleetwood's request, Green overdubbed electric guitar on "Brown Eyes", although his playing was only included on the fade-out for the official release. The full recording session, dated 20 September 1979, appears on disc three of the 2015 deluxe edition of Tusk, which contains alternate recordings of the album's 20 tracks. This version has McVie singing different lyrics to those on the original album.

In a 1999 interview with the Penguin, Green admitted that he had no recollection of the recording session, likely due to his deteriorating health in the 70s.  Buckingham also did not recall the sessions taking place. “I don’t remember Peter Green coming in, so I don’t think I made any judgement on whether to use [his part] or not. Mick would ultimately have had the decision to use his playing or not. And it was Christine’s song to do with as she wished.“

"Brown Eyes" was also performed on the Mirage Tour and the Shake the Cage Tour.

Personnel
Mick Fleetwood – drums, tambourine
John McVie – bass guitar
Christine McVie – keyboards, lead and backing vocals
Lindsey Buckingham – guitar, backing vocals
Stevie Nicks – backing vocals
Peter Green – guitar

References

Fleetwood Mac songs
1979 songs
Songs written by Christine McVie
Song recordings produced by Ken Caillat
Song recordings produced by Richard Dashut